A ravenstone is a place of execution, akin to gallows.

Ravenstone may also refer to:

 Ravenstone (brand), a destination gift shop and online retailer

Ravenstone, Buckinghamshire, City of Milton Keynes, England
Ravenstone, Leicestershire, England
Ravenstone with Snibston, a civil parish in Leicestershire
Ravenstone (band)